Wild District is a Colombian streaming television series created by Cristian Conti. The series is produced by Dynamo Producciones for Netflix and stars Juan Pablo Raba as the lead character. It tells the story of Jhon Jeiver (Juan Pablo Raba), a guerrilla fighter who moves from the jungle to Bogotá after the signing of the Peace Treaty. It is Netflix's first Colombian original series.

Cast 

 Juan Pablo Raba as Jhon Jeiver "Yei Yei" / Jhon Gómez 
 Nicolás Quiroga Pineda as Mario Gómez (Jhon Jeiver's son)
 Cristina Umaña as Daniela León
 Susana Torrez as Carmen Caicedo
 Camila Sodi as Gissele Duque
 Carolina Acevedo as Alex Mallarino
 Christian Tappan as Apache
 Juan Fernando Sánchez as Caldera
 Juan Sebastián Calero as Raúl/Aníbal
 Julio Pachón as Coronel Rama
 Alina Lozano as Francisca, the mother of Jhon Jeiver
 Paula Castaño as Verónica
 Camila Jurado as Juliana
 Camilo Jiménez Varón as Senator Federico Ibargüen
 Walter Díaz as Saúl
 Andrés Toro as Ramón 
 Jennifer Hyde as Julie
 Estefanía Piñeres as Stefany Arbelo
 Nina Caicedo as Misury
 Juan Pablo Urrego as Edilson
 Roberto Cano as Senator Edgar Santos
 Ed Hughes as Paul
 Sebastián Eslava as Mérida
 Helena Mallarino as Clara
 Andrés Londoño as Nicolas Gamero

Episodes

Season 1 (2018)

Season 2 (2019)

Notes

References

External links 
 

2018 Colombian television series debuts
Colombian television series
Spanish-language Netflix original programming